The Lansing Civic Center was a convention center located in downtown Lansing, Michigan at 525 West Allegan Street, the southeast corner of West Allegan and South Pine Streets. It opened in 1955 and had a 6,500-capacity auditorium, which was host to events such as circuses and rock concerts, as well as the Michigan Constitutional Convention of 1961. The center was renamed Lansing Civic Arena in 1987 as to not be confused with the new Lansing Center. The building was demolished in 1999.

References

Convention centers in Michigan
Buildings and structures completed in 1955
1955 establishments in Michigan
Demolished buildings and structures in Michigan
Buildings and structures demolished in 1999